Petersburg is a borough in Huntingdon County, Pennsylvania, United States. It was a stop on the former Pennsylvania Railroad Main Line between Tyrone and Huntingdon and the junction point for the Petersburg Branch. The population was 480 at the 2010 census.

Geography
Petersburg is located in northern Huntingdon County at  (40.572417, -78.048036). It sits on the east side of Shaver Creek where it joins the Juniata River, just east of that river's source at the confluence of the Little Juniata River and the Frankstown Branch.

Pennsylvania Route 305 passes through Petersburg, leading northeast  to Greenwood Furnace State Park and west  to Alexandria.

Demographics

As of the census of 2000, there were 455 people, 177 households, and 132 families residing in the borough. The population density was 1,182.1 people per square mile (462.3/km²). There were 193 housing units at an average density of 501.4 per square mile (196.1/km²). The racial makeup of the borough was 99.56% White, 0.22% Native American, and 0.22% from two or more races.

There were 177 households, out of which 31.6% had children under the age of 18 living with them, 57.6% were married couples living together, 11.9% had a female householder with no husband present, and 25.4% were non-families. 18.6% of all households were made up of individuals, and 7.9% had someone living alone who was 65 years of age or older. The average household size was 2.57 and the average family size was 2.91.

In the borough the population was spread out, with 24.2% under the age of 18, 9.2% from 18 to 24, 32.3% from 25 to 44, 21.1% from 45 to 64, and 13.2% who were 65 years of age or older. The median age was 35 years. For every 100 females there were 92.0 males. For every 100 females age 18 and over, there were 89.6 males.

The median income for a household in the borough was $34,013, and the median income for a family was $35,417. Males had a median income of $29,375 versus $17,292 for females. The per capita income for the borough was $16,141. About 3.7% of families and 6.3% of the population were below the poverty line, including 6.0% of those under age 18 and 11.8% of those age 65 or over.

References

Populated places established in 1795
Boroughs in Huntingdon County, Pennsylvania
1795 establishments in Pennsylvania